Eşme is a town and district of Uşak Province in the inner Aegean Region of  Turkey. Apart from the central town of Eşme, the district counts three townships with own municipality, namely Yeleğen, Ahmetler and Güllü.

The principal economic activities include tobacco farming, stockbreeding, kilim weaving and trading.

History
From 1867 to 1922, Eşme was part of the Aidin Vilayet of the Ottoman Empire.

References

External links 
 

Districts of Uşak Province
Populated places in Uşak Province
Towns in Turkey